A Dog of Flanders is a 1960 American drama film directed by James B. Clark, with stars David Ladd, Donald Crisp and Theodore Bikel. It is based on the 1872 novel of the same name by Ouida. It was released on March 17, 1960, by 20th Century Fox in CinemaScope and Color by De Luxe.

Unlike the novel, which has a tragic end, the film has a happy ending for the boy and his dog.

Spike (who played Old Yeller in the 1959 Disney Film) plays Patrasche in 20th Century Fox's A Dog of Flanders with Donald Crisp and David Ladd in 1959.

Plot
The emotional story of a boy, his grandfather, and his dog. The boy's dream of becoming a great classical painter appears shattered when his loving grandfather dies.

Cast
David Ladd as Nello Daas  	 
Donald Crisp as Jehan Daas  	 
Theodore Bikel as Piet Van Gelder
Max Croiset as Cogez the miller  	 
Monique Ahrens as Corrie  	 
Siohban Taylor as Alois Cogez  	 
Gijsbert Tersteeg as the landlord	 
John Soer as the peddler  	 
Katherine Holland as the miller's wife  	 
Lo van Hensbergen as the priest  	 
"Patrasche" - Sam the Bluetick Coonhound
Hans Tiemeyer	 	 
Maxim Hamel	 	 
John De Freese	 	 
Mathieu van Eysden	 	 
Katja Berndsen	 	 
Heleen van Meurs 	 
Ulla Larsen

Production
Robert L. Lippert enjoyed success with a children's film starring David Ladd called The Sad Horse.

The film was announced in March 1959. Robert L. Lippert says the film was originally shot in black and white "but everything was so beautiful so we changed it to color."

Filming started June 22, 1959. The film was shot in Holland and Belgium.

It included a 12-minute scene where Theodore Bikel gives a painting lesson. "Everybody thought they were crazy when he did that", said producer Radnitz. "But the kids loved it."

Comic book adaptation
 Dell Four Color #1088 (April 1960)

Reception
The film was one of Lippert's most successful films, commercially making over $3 million. Hedda Hopper called it "the sleeper of the year."

Lippert bought a story, Gallus to make as a follow up for Clark and Ladd. However the film was not made. They ended up making Misty.

Writer Ted Sherdeman and director Clark later formed their own company, Gemtaur.

The film was first in the children's film category at the Venice Film Festival.

See also
 List of American films of 1960

References

External links

Dog of Flanders at BFI

A Dog of Flanders at TV Guide (a revised and expanded version of 1987 write-up which was originally published in The Motion Picture Guide)

1960 films
Films based on works by Ouida
Films shot in Antwerp
1960 drama films
20th Century Fox films
CinemaScope films
American drama films
Films adapted into comics
Films about dogs
Films directed by James B. Clark
Films scored by Paul Sawtell
Works based on A Dog of Flanders
1960s English-language films
1960s American films